Hopeless Savages is a comic book series created and written by Jen Van Meter, and published by Oni Press. Thus far there have been three four-issue miniseries (also released as trade paperbacks), a one-shot, and an original graphic novel, all written by van Meter but each one of them illustrated by a different set of artists, including Christine Norrie, Chynna Clugston, Andi Watson, Bryan Lee O'Malley, Vera Brosgol, and Meredith McClaren.

The story follows the members of the Hopeless-Savage family. Parents Dirk Hopeless and Nikki Savage are old-school punks who were part of the 1970s punk scene. They married and moved to the suburbs to raise their children. The three oldest, Rat Bastard, Arsenal Fierce, and Twitch Strummer, are grown and have moved out of the house; youngest daughter Skank Zero is in high school as the series begins.

The thread running throughout the stories is a family which superficially does not fit the norm but which can still stand together and function better than most "normal" families.

Characters

The Hopeless-Savage Family
The Hopeless-Savages live in a typical suburban neighborhood in the fictitious Flange City. Although all of the family's children were born and raised in the United States, they all make frequent use of the working-class British slang that they grew up with.
Dirk Hopeless – The patriarch of the Hopeless-Savage clan. His real name is David Sterling, and before he finds success as a punk rocker he was a teen idol in his native England, performing as part of Little Davie and the Sterlings. Feeling creatively stunted by his bubblegum-pop persona, he changes his name to Dirk Hopeless and becomes involved in the punk scene. He is the voice of reason in the Hopeless-Savage family, balancing out Nikki's sharp temper. He is also the primary cook for the family, often seen puttering around the kitchen in an apron.
Nikki Savage – The matriarch of the Hopeless-Savage clan. Nikki grew up in Nebraska, helping out in her family's bakery. Wanting to escape small-town life, she follows a boyfriend to the big city, where she finds musical success and drug addiction. After completing rehab, her manager Weej introduces her to Dirk and they end up touring together, eventually falling in love and getting married. Nikki is tough and scrappy, proving throughout the series that she can hold her own. She also has a violent temper and Dirk affectionately describes her as "a bit mad".
Rat Bastard Hopeless-Savage – Rat is the eldest of the Hopeless-Savage children. At age fifteen he is rejected by a girl he is dating, prompting him to renounce his punk roots and move away from home. In the first miniseries he is working at Monjava (a company resembling Starbucks) at their corporate office, using his father's old name David Sterling. After the events of the first series he moves home and begins using his own name again. While growing up Rat took his older brother role seriously and his younger siblings looked up to him, particularly Zero. He is the only member of the family who is currently single. 
Arsenal Fierce Hopeless-Savage – The second-oldest, Arsenal runs a martial arts dojo and lives with her boyfriend Claude Shi, a fashion designer. As a child, Arsenal constantly got into fights and was expelled from so many schools that her parents eventually enrolled her in parochial school, which she actually enjoyed. Arsenal has played the role of protector ever since she was young; the reason for all those fights was her desire to protect weaker children from bullies. In college she becomes an activist, participating in such events as Take Back the Night. She has grown up to be fairly level-headed but still very protective, sometimes still acting rashly in extreme circumstances. Arsenal is an extremely skilled fighter and a top competitor in martial arts tournaments. She is an affectionate older sister to Zero, who she usually calls "Skankabelle". Whenever Arsenal goes on vacation she gets a new tattoo, likening it to getting a new stamp in her passport.
Twitch Strummer Hopeless-Savage – The third-oldest, Twitch works as an artist and theatrical set designer. He dates Claude's younger brother Henry Shi, whom he dated in high school before breaking up to go to college. Unlike the rest of his family, Twitch identifies more with mod culture rather than punk. He sometimes exhibits hyperactive tendencies which some theorize is the result of controlled substances (he jokes about being on crack early in the first issue) and sometimes will work all night on a project without sleep.
Skank Zero Hopeless-Savage – The youngest sibling and main protagonist of the series; most of the stories unfold around Zero. As a high school (and later college) student, she is the only member of the family who is still in school. Zero fronts a band called the Dusted Bunnies and studies filmmaking as a backup plan. She dates Ginger Kincaid, the class genius. Scrappy and outspoken, Zero reminds Nikki of a younger version of herself and as a result gets into several arguments with her mother, who tends to be overprotective of her. Since she was a young child, Zero has used a variety of unique words and phrases which sound similar to Cockney slang, but which she herself invented. This is often a source of confusion to her teachers and other people outside her circle of family and friends.

Other characters
Norwegian "Weej" Blue – Nikki and Dirk's former manager, who originally introduces the two at his birthday party right after picking Nikki up from rehab. Dirk eventually fires Weej, saying that he would trust him with his life but not his money. Weej is named after the fictional species of parrot in the Dead Parrot sketch in Monty Python's Flying Circus.
Ginger Kincaid – Zero's boyfriend. A genius, MIT personally invites him to tour their campus and interview for admission. He originally meets Zero when she and her siblings help him stand up to bullies as a child. The two eventually leave to attend different colleges, leading to emotional strain as they work to maintain their long-distance relationship.
Claude Shi – Arsenal's live-in boyfriend who works as a fashion designer. The two meet while still in school at a martial arts tournament.
Henry Shi – Claude's younger brother, a musician and Twitch's boyfriend. Twitch originally broke up with him when Henry was admitted to Juilliard, afraid of holding him back. In the second miniseries, Hopeless Savages: Ground Zero, they reunite.
The Dusted Bunnies – The punk-influenced alternative rock band Zero fronts as lead singer, guitarist and songwriter. The other members are Emma (guitar), Toby (bass) and Flora (drums). Emma and Toby are dating. Flora has a more brash and assertive personality. The band's origins and how they all met is the topic of the one-shot Hopeless Savages B-Sides: The Origin of the Dusted Bunnies.
Tiffany Brenner – Tiffany dated Rat when they were teenagers, but cruelly rejected him when his parents would not help her further her musical ambitions. She is later found working as a personal assistant for Norwegian Blue and is assaulted by Zero, who blamed her for Rat's leaving the family. Later, as a way of making amends, Tiffany offers to use her contacts and knowledge of the music industry as manager of the Dusted Bunnies.
Undertow – A popular and successful punk rock band formed by Dirk Hopeless in the 1970s. In addition to Dirk the band consisted of bassist Norman "Stink" Kearne (known as "Uncle Stinky" to the Hopeless-Savage children) and drummer Owen Keyhole. Nikki later joined as co-lead singer. Undertow was popular enough to warrant television documentaries and compilation albums decades later, and Dirk and Nikki received Grammy Awards at some point.

Publications

Stories

 Hopeless Savages – Art by Christine Norrie with flashbacks illustrated by Chynna Clugston-Major. The first miniseries deals with Dirk and Nikki being kidnapped and their children trying to find them. They suspect it has something to do with their parents' past; so Arsenal, Twitch, and Zero first track down their older brother Rat, who they believe would know more about the situation but who left the family ten years earlier. Zero is at first reluctant to find him, feeling betrayed when he left. They finally locate him using their father's real name as a pseudonym and working at a trendy coffee company's corporate office. After attempting to de-program him they unravel the mystery of their parents' abduction, which stems back to copyright issues and Dirk's embarrassing past as a teen idol.
 Hopeless Savages: Ground Zero – Art by Bryan Lee O'Malley with segments illustrated by Andi Watson, Christine Norrie, Chynna Clugston-Major and Terry Dodson. The second miniseries covers the beginning of Zero and Ginger's relationship. Throughout the course of the story Zero keeps getting grounded by Nikki for various offenses like punching a boy who made a crass comment regarding her name and coming home late from band practice. While all this is going on, Antique Rock Television is filming a Behind the Music-type show about Dirk and Nikki, and Nikki is trying to remaster her old albums for a re-release. This is also the series in which Twitch and Henry get back together.

 Too Much Hopeless Savages! – Art by Christine Norrie and Sophie Campbell. The third miniseries centers mostly around Arsenal and Twitch's trip to Hong Kong, although the scenes which take place at home are still documented from Zero's point of view. Arsenal is entered in a martial arts tournament; Henry and Claude want to visit their Grandmother Shi, who is a renowned fortune teller. Arsenal is particularly anxious about the match since she will be fighting a man who she fought as an adolescent; he sucker punched her and she ended up in the hospital, the only major injury from all her many brawls. However, within minutes of arriving someone slips a much coveted item into Arsenal's bag at the airport, and before long they are being hunted by local criminals and the British Secret Service. Back in the States, the Hopeless-Savage family is being harassed by a conservative Christian group led by a charismatic preacher who is manipulating Nikki's mother Vera. Fed up with the picketers on their lawn, the family decides to join Arsenal and Twitch in Hong Kong, taking Grandma Savage along with them.

 Hopeless Savages: B-sides: The Origin of the Dusted Bunnies – Art by Becky Cloonan, Vera Brosgol, and Mike Norton. A one-shot (March 2005) that tells the story of how Zero formed her band. Separate vignettes show how she met each member, starting with Flora in junior high and working backwards to Emma in elementary school and Toby as a toddler.

 Hopeless Savages: Break – Art by Meredith McClaren with flashbacks by Christine Norrie. The first Hopeless-Savages story published originally as a graphic novel rather than a series of individual comics issues. Zero is now attending college, and is having trouble dealing with the pressure and her difficult roommate. She decides to spend Spring Break touring with the Dusted Bunnies, but they find that a rival band is trying to sabotage their tour for unknown reasons. Dirk is called to the bedside of a dying friend and former bandmate. Nikki is injured while on a solo tour, and calls upon Rat to make sure the hospital does not give her narcotics which may cause her to relapse into drug dependency. Arsenal and Claude are struggling with their newborn twins, and trying to decide what to name them. Twitch and Henry are miserable while on tour with a travelling ice show, and try extraordinary means to get out of their contract.

Short stories
 "Sticks and Stones" - Art by Chynna Clugston-Major. The first published Hopeless-Savages story, appearing in Oni Press Summer Vacation Supercolor Fun Special (2000). Rat, Arsenal and Twitch are all suspended from their elementary school for fighting and bad language.

 "Romance #1" - Art by Christine Norrie. Appeared in Oni Press Color Special (2001). Romance blossoms when Arsenal and Claude meet as opponents at a martial arts tournament, while their brothers Twitch and Henry also meet in the audience.

 "Open House" - Art by Christine Norrie. Originally published online. Dirk and Nikki attend a school open house and discover how Rat, Arsenal and Twitch are seen by their teachers.

 "Good Fences" - Art by Christine Norrie. Appeared in the Hopeless Savages trade paperback. The Hopeless-Savage family as seen through the years from the perspective of their back-yard neighbors.

 "Music Boxes" - Art by Tim Fish. Appeared in the Young Bottoms in Love comic. Twitch and Henry find a variety of musical accompaniment while their family and friends help them move into an apartment.

 "Some of My Best Words Are Friends" - Art by Meredith McClaren. Appeared in the Greatest Hits 2000-2010 omnibus. An illustrated glossary of Zero's unique vocabulary.

Trade paperbacks
Hopeless Savages (2002) - 
Hopeless Savages: Ground Zero (2003) - 
Too Much Hopeless Savages! (2004) - 
Hopeless Savages: Greatest Hits 2000-2010 (2010) - , Collects all three trades plus bonus material
Hopeless Savages: Break (2015) - . Original graphic novel.

Reception

The series has been praised for its depiction of a gay main character. In the introduction to the collected volume 2: Ground Zero, an editorial comments on how few and far between compassionate portrayals of homosexual relationships are and how well the story deals with Twitch and Henry's relationship.

External links
 
 

Comics publications
2002 comics debuts
Oni Press titles
Comic book limited series
LGBT-related graphic novels
Punk comics